The 12th Cook Islands Parliament was a term of the Parliament of the Cook Islands.  Its composition was determined by the 2006 elections, held on September 27, 2006.  It was dissolved for the 2010 election on 24 September 2010.

Due to an electoral petition declaring the election of Robert Wigmore invalid, the 12th Parliament initially consisted of only 23 members.  A by-election was held for the vacant Titikaveka seat on 7 February 2007, and Wigmore was re-elected.

Due to a large number of electoral petitions and the need for a by-election to resolve the tied seat of Akaoa, the Parliament did not meet for the first time until December 2006.

Of the 24 Members of Parliament, three were women.  The Speaker of the 12th Parliament was Mapu Taia.

Members

Initial MPs

New members

Summary of changes
 Robert Wigmore's election in the seat of Titikaveka was declared invalid by an electoral petition.  He was re-elected in a by-election on 7 February 2007.
 Mii Parima died on December 6, 2008.  He was replaced by Pukeiti Pukeiti following the 2009 Tamarua by-election.
 Wilkie Rasmussen was expelled from the Cook Islands Democratic Party on 25 August 2009.
 Jim Marurai was expelled from the Democratic party on 23 December 2009.
 Robert Wigmore, Cassey Eggelton, William (Smiley) Heather and Apii Piho were expelled from the Democratic Party on 8 April 2010.

References

External links
 Members of the Parliament of the Cook Islands

Politics of the Cook Islands
2006 in the Cook Islands
2007 in the Cook Islands
2008 in the Cook Islands
2009 in the Cook Islands
2010 in the Cook Islands